Neola is an unincorporated community in Stafford County, Kansas, United States.  It is located southeast of Stafford, next to a former railroad at SE 130th Ave and Neola Rd.

History
A post office was opened in Neola in 1878 and remained in operation until it was discontinued in 1918.

References

Further reading

External links
 Stafford County maps: Current, Historic, KDOT
 , from Hatteberg's People on KAKE TV news

Unincorporated communities in Stafford County, Kansas
Unincorporated communities in Kansas